Rolando Jurquin Despaigne (born June 7, 1987) is a Cuban volleyball player, who plays as a wing-spiker. He was a member of the national squad of Cuba that claimed the bronze medal at the 2007 Pan American Games in Rio de Janeiro, Brazil.

Sporting achievements

Club

National Championships
 2010/2011  Greek Championship with Olympiacos

 2011/2012  Greek Championship with Iraklis

National Cups
 2010/2011  Greek Cup, with Olympiacos
 2011/2012  Greek Cup, with Iraklis

Individually
 2010-11 Greek Championship MVP
 2011 Final four Greek Cup MVP
 2012 Final four Greek Cup MVP

References
 FIVB biography

1987 births
Living people
Cuban men's volleyball players
Volleyball players at the 2007 Pan American Games
Olympiacos S.C. players
Iraklis V.C. players
Aris V.C. players
Pan American Games bronze medalists for Cuba
Pan American Games medalists in volleyball
Medalists at the 2007 Pan American Games
21st-century Cuban people